Parapercis biordinis is a fish species in the sandperch family, Pinguipedidae. 
It is found in Western Australia and the Philippines.

References

Randall, J.E., 2001. Pinguipedidae (= Parapercidae, Mugiloididae). Sandperches. p. 3501-3510. In K.E. Carpenter and V. Niem (eds.) FAO species identification guide for fishery purposes. The living marine resources of the Western Central Pacific. Vol. 6. Bony fishes part 4 (Labridae to Latimeriidae), estuarine crocodiles. FAO, Rome.

Pinguipedidae
Taxa named by Gerald R. Allen
Fish described in 1976